Baiyin District is the main urban district of and the economic, cultural and political center of the prefecture-level city of Baiyin, Gansu province of the People's Republic of China. It has a population of 290,000, 90% of whom live in the urban area. It was established as an administrative division in 1961.

Geography 
The urban area is located in a mountain basin at an elevation of around 1,700 m. The south of Baiyin district is traversed by the Yellow River, the only non-intermittent river in the district, and the main source of water for drinking and irrigation. The plains along the river are at circa 1,500 m. In 1998, floods caused economic damage and 3 people went missing in the towns near the river. Since then, hydropower dams have been built on the Yellow River.

The climate is temperate continental and semi-arid. The average temperature is 8.5 °C. The average annual precipitation is 204.3 mm, concentrated in the summer months. Due to the dry climate, the natural vegetation is mainly limited to arid grasslands. Baiyin is frequently hit by sandstorms.

Baiyin District had large non-ferrous metal resources, which have been exploited through open-pit mines. By 2008, most mines had become exhausted.

Economy 
Baiyin District ranks in the middle regions of GDP per capita in Gansu province. Formerly a mining town, the economy has come to rely on production of building materials, chemicals and agriculture.

Administrative divisions
Baiyin District is divided to 5 subdistricts, 3 towns and 2 townships.
Subdistricts

Towns
 Shuichuan()
 Silong()
 Wangxian()

Townships
 Qiangwan Township()
 Wuchuan Township()

See also
 List of administrative divisions of Gansu

References

County-level divisions of Gansu
Baiyin